Park Chan-yong may refer to:

 Park Chan-yong (boxer) (born 1963)
 Park Chan-yong (footballer) (born 1996)
 Park Chan-yong (handballer) (born 1980)

See also
 Park Chan-young (disambiguation)